Donald Edward Williams (3 November 1935 – 19 October 1995) was an Australian rules footballer who played for Melbourne during the 1950s and 1960s.

Williams was a half-back flanker and five time premiership player with Melbourne, including their successive triumphs in 1955, 1956 and 1957. After being dropped to the bench in the 1959 grand final he decided to leave the club and spent the 1960 season with West Perth, who won the WAFL Grand Final in that year. He represented Western Australia in the Brisbane Carnival where Western Australia defeated Victoria for the first time.

He returned to the Melbourne Football Club in 1964 and played in that year's four-point Grand Final win over Collingwood.

In 2000 he was named on the half-back flank in Melbourne's official Team of the Century.

Statistics

|- style="background:#EAEAEA"
| scope="row" text-align:center | 1953
| 
| 25 || 16 || 0 ||  ||  ||  ||  ||  ||  || 0.0 ||  ||  ||  ||  ||  ||  || 8
|-
| scope="row" text-align:center | 1954
| 
| 25 || 21 || 0 ||  ||  ||  ||  ||  ||  || 0.0 ||  ||  ||  ||  ||  ||  || 0
|- style="background:#EAEAEA"
| scope="row" text-align:center | 1955
| 
| 25 || 20 || 0 ||  ||  ||  ||  ||  ||  || 0.0 ||  ||  ||  ||  ||  ||  || 3
|-
| scope="row" text-align:center | 1956
| 
| 25 || 18 || 0 ||  ||  ||  ||  ||  ||  || 0.0 ||  ||  ||  ||  ||  ||  || 4
|- style="background:#EAEAEA"
| scope="row" text-align:center | 1957
| 
| 25 || 21 || 1 ||  ||  ||  ||  ||  ||  || 0.0 ||  ||  ||  ||  ||  ||  || 6
|-
| scope="row" text-align:center | 1958
| 
| 25,12 || 20 || 0 ||  ||  ||  ||  ||  ||  || 0.0 ||  ||  ||  ||  ||  ||  || 6
|- style="background:#EAEAEA"
| scope="row" text-align:center | 1959
| 
| 25 || 17 || 2 ||  ||  ||  ||  ||  ||  || 0.1 ||  ||  ||  ||  ||  ||  || 0
|-
| scope="row" text-align:center | 1964
| 
| 35 || 17 || 2 ||  ||  ||  ||  ||  ||  || 0.1 ||  ||  ||  ||  ||  ||  || 2
|- style="background:#EAEAEA"
| scope="row" text-align:center | 1965
| 
| 35 || 17 || 1 || 2 || 205 || 21 || 226 || 56 ||  || 0.1 || 0.1 || 12.1 || 1.2 || 13.3 || 3.3 ||  || 9
|-
| scope="row" text-align:center | 1966
| 
| 35 || 18 || 0 || 0 || 239 || 27 || 266 || 66 ||  || 0.0 || 0.0 || 13.3 || 1.5 || 14.8 || 3.7 ||  || 4
|- style="background:#EAEAEA"
| scope="row" text-align:center | 1967
| 
| 35 || 17 || 0 || 0 || 237 || 32 || 269 || 63 ||  || 0.0 || 0.0 || 13.9 || 1.9 || 15.8 || 3.7 ||  || 3
|-
| scope="row" text-align:center | 1968
| 
| 35 || 3 || 0 || 0 || 34 || 6 || 40 || 10 ||  || 0.0 || 0.0 || 11.3 || 2.0 || 13.3 || 3.3 ||  || 0
|- class="sortbottom"
! colspan=3 | Career
! 205
! 5
! 2
! 715
! 86
! 801
! 195
! 
! 0.0
! 0.0
! 13.0
! 1.6
! 14.6
! 3.5
! 
! 45
|}

References

External links

 
 Don Williams profile at Australian Football.com
 Don Williams, at Demonwki.
 Donald Edward Williams, at The VFA Project.
 Don Williams, at Boyles Football Photos.

1935 births
Australian rules footballers from Victoria (Australia)
Melbourne Football Club players
West Perth Football Club players
Sale Football Club players
1995 deaths
Five-time VFL/AFL Premiership players
Melbourne Football Club Premiership players